

Statistics Norway demographic statistics 

{{Historical populations
|footnote = Source: Statistics Norway .
|shading = off
|1769|329041
|1951|1584045  	
|1960|1733346  	  	
|1970|1895148  	  	  	
|1980|1982131  	
|1990|2064971  	  	
|2000|2207164  	  	  	
|2010|2430512
|2020|2708720
|2030|2970713	 	
}}

The following demographic statistics are from the Statistics Norway, unless otherwise indicated.

Age and sex distribution

Age structure

 Norway 

(2005 est.) 0–14 years: 19.7% (male 466,243; female 443,075) 15–64 years: 65.6% (male 1,234,384; female 1,486,887) 65 years and over: 14.7% (male 285,389; female 392,331)

 Eastern Norway 

(2009 est.) 0–14 years: 18.6% (male 226,334; female 214,775) 15–64 years: 64.5% (male 765,005; female 759,737) 65 years and over: 16.9% (male 150,656; female 201,963)

Population

 2,207,164 (January 1, 2000)
 2,410,630 (July 1, 2009)
 Population growth
 203,466 (8.44%)

Population - comparative
slightly larger than Latvia, but slightly smaller than Mongolia and Jamaica.

Population growth rate

1.59% (in 2008)

Population growth rate - comparative
slightly larger than India, but slightly smaller than Turkmenistan.

Total fertility rate

1.85 children born/woman (2007)

Language

Literacydefinition: age 15 and over can read and write total population: 100% male: NA% female:'' NA%

Demographics of Norway